McGinn (Mcginn) is an Irish surname, and may refer to

 Brock McGinn, Canadian ice hockey player
 Colin McGinn, British philosopher
 Conor McGinn, Irish politician in England, Labour MP for St Helens North since 2015
 Dan McGinn, American baseball player
 Jamie McGinn, Canadian ice hockey player
 John McGinn, Scottish footballer
 Michael McGinn, mayor of Seattle (2010-2013)
 Niall McGinn, Northern Irish footballer
 Paul McGinn, Scottish footballer
 Sandy McGinn, Scottish footballer
 Stephen McGinn, Scottish footballer